Lajas may refer to:

Lajas, Cuba (Cienfuegos province)
Lajas, small barrio in Consolación del Sur, Cuba
Lajas, Puerto Rico, a municipality of Puerto Rico
Lajas, Lajas, a barrio in Lajas, Puerto Rico
Lajas barrio-pueblo, a barrio-pueblo in Lajas, Puerto Rico
Lajas Arriba, a barrio in Lajas, Puerto Rico

See also
Lajes (disambiguation)
Las Lajas (disambiguation)